"Ashes of Eden" is a song by American rock band Breaking Benjamin, released on May 3, 2016 as the fourth single on the band's fifth studio album Dark Before Dawn.

Music video
The music video for the song was released in July 2016. When describing it, frontman Benjamin Burnley described it as a "modern sci-fi take on Adam and Eve," and cited influence from Gravity and Star Trek, "probably because I'm into that kind of stuff, it's probably subconsciously affected it."

Charts
Reaching a peak of No. 18 on the Mainstream Rock chart, "Ashes of Eden" became Breaking Benjamin's fifth lowest-charting single to date there. Despite this, the single was certified Gold by the RIAA on February 6, 2020.

Certifications

References

2016 singles
Breaking Benjamin songs
2015 songs
Songs written by Benjamin Burnley
Hollywood Records singles